To Love the Damned is a 1980 Italian drama film directed by Marco Tullio Giordana. It competed in the Un Certain Regard section at the 1980 Cannes Film Festival. It won the Golden Leopard award at the Locarno International Film Festival in 1980.

Cast
 Flavio Bucci – Riccardo, detto Svitol
 Biagio Pelligra – Commissario
 Micaela Pignatelli – Letizia
 Alfredo Pea – Vincenzo
 Anna Miserocchi – La madre
 Agnès Nobecourt – Guya (as Agnès de Nobecourt)
 Pasquale Zito
 Massimo Jacoboni
 Franco Bizzoccoli – Partigiano
 Stefano Manca di Villahermosa – Carlino
 David Riondino – Beniamino

References

External links

1980 films
1980s Italian-language films
1980 drama films
Films directed by Marco Tullio Giordana
Golden Leopard winners
Films set in 1978
Films set in Milan
Italian drama films
1980s Italian films